María Forqué (born 1990), known by the stage name Virgen María, is a Spanish DJ and record producer.

Discography

Mixtapes

Extended plays

Singles

Guest appearances

References

1990 births
Living people
Spanish DJs
Spanish record producers
Women DJs
Women record producers
Date of birth missing (living people)
Place of birth missing (living people)